Chiayi is a high-speed rail station in Taibao City, Chiayi County, Taiwan served by Taiwan High Speed Rail.

Overview

The station is elevated with two side platforms. The two platforms are connected by an overhead skyway. The station was designed by Fei & Cheng Associates and constructed primarily by Takenaka Corporation. The roof of the station building and the platform are horizontally connected, and an oval-shaped skylight is installed in the center of the station hall.

History

THSR
 2006-11-03: The station opened for service.
 2007-01-05: The segment from Banqiao to  opened for service. Trains begin stopping at the station.

Bus rapid transit
 2007-01-05: A temporary bus rapid transit (BRT) line linking the station begins service.
 2008-01-31: Chiayi Bus Rapid Transit (BRT) formally opens for service.

Station layout

HSR services
HSR services 203, 295, 1202, (1)3xx, 583, 598, (1)6xx, and (8)8xx call at this station.

Around the station
 Chang Gung University of Science and Technology
 Ping Huang Coffee Museum
 Southern Branch of the National Palace Museum
 Zhecheng Cultural Park
 Chiayi County Special Zone
 Chiayi County Government
 Suantou Village (Lioujiao administrative center)
 Chiayi County Baseball Stadium
 Chang Gung Memorial Hospital, Chiayi Branch
 National Taiwan College of Physical Education, Chiayi Campus

References

2006 establishments in Taiwan
Railway stations in Chiayi County
Railway stations opened in 2006
Railway stations served by Taiwan High Speed Rail